Rugāji Municipality is a former municipality in Latgale, Latvia. The municipality was formed in 2009 by merging Rugāji Parish and Lazdukalns Parish, the administrative centre being Rugāji. The population in 2020 was 2,061.

On 1 July 2021, Rugāji Municipality ceased to exist and its territory was merged into Balvi Municipality.

See also 
 Administrative divisions of Latvia (2009)

References 

 
Former municipalities of Latvia
Latgale